This is a list of diplomatic missions of Poland

Excluding from this listing are honorary consulates, cultural institutes, and trade missions. On the other hand, the Polish Office in Taipei is included, as it serves as a de facto embassy to Taiwan, with which Poland does not have formal diplomatic relations.

Current missions

Africa

Americas

Asia

Europe

Oceania

Multilateral Organizations

Closed missions

Africa

Americas

Asia

Europe

Flags and plaques

Poland makes use of its state flag with coat of arms to designate Polish missions abroad. This flag is, according to legislation, to be used only by the Polish government and its associated agencies and diplomatic service. Additionally the flag is used as an ensign by Polish-registered ships on the high seas. Finally, the traditional governmental plaque is also affixed to all Polish missions abroad.

See also

Foreign relations of Poland

Notes

References

 
Poland
Diplomatic missions